Statistics of Ekstraklasa for the 1958 season.

Overview
12 teams competed in the 1958 season. ŁKS Łódź won the championship.

League table

Results

Top goalscorers

References
Poland – List of final tables at RSSSF 

Ekstraklasa seasons
1
Pol
Pol